Nerkin Charbakh, (also, Nerkin Ch’arbakh and Nizhniy Charbakh) is a part of Shengavit District in Yerevan, Armenia.

References 
 

Populated places in Yerevan